Saša Bogunović (born 16 December 1982) is a Serbian former professional footballer who played as a striker. He is the younger brother of fellow footballer Dejan Bogunović.

Career
Bogunović started out at his hometown club Novi Sad. He scored 11 goals in the 2001–02 Second League of FR Yugoslavia, as the team placed third in Group North. In early 2003, Bogunović moved on loan to Bulgarian club Litex Lovech until the end of the season. He came on as a substitute in the 2003 Bulgarian Cup Final, as the team lost 2–1 to Levski Sofia.

In early 2006, Bogunović moved abroad for the second time and joined Hungarian club Zalaegerszeg. He spent the next two seasons with Polish side Widzew Łódź, before returning to his parent club Novi Sad in the summer of 2008.

References

External links
 
 
 
 

Association football forwards
First Professional Football League (Bulgaria) players
Ekstraklasa players
Expatriate footballers in Bulgaria
Expatriate footballers in Hungary
Expatriate footballers in Poland
Expatriate footballers in Thailand
FK Banat Zrenjanin players
RFK Novi Sad 1921 players
FK Proleter Novi Sad players
Nemzeti Bajnokság I players
PFC Litex Lovech players
Sasa Bogunovic
Serbia and Montenegro expatriate footballers
Serbia and Montenegro expatriate sportspeople in Bulgaria
Serbia and Montenegro expatriate sportspeople in Hungary
Serbia and Montenegro footballers
Serbian expatriate footballers
Serbian expatriate sportspeople in Poland
Serbian expatriate sportspeople in Thailand
Serbian First League players
Serbian footballers
Footballers from Novi Sad
Widzew Łódź players
Zalaegerszegi TE players
1982 births
Living people